Růžena Maturová (2 September 186925 February 1938) was a Czech operatic soprano whose international career began in the late 1880s and continued through the first decade of the 20th century.

Born in Prague, Bohemia, she was the leading soprano at the National Theatre there and created roles in several operas including three by Antonín Dvořák: the Princess in The Devil and Kate (1898), and the title roles in Rusalka (1901) and Armida (1904).

After her retirement from the stage in 1910, she taught singing in Prague. Her most famous pupil was the contralto Marta Krásová. Maturová also appeared in four silent films in the early 1920s.

Růžena Maturová died in Prague in 1938 at the age of 68.

References

1869 births
1938 deaths
Czech operatic sopranos
Actresses from Prague
Czech film actresses
Czech silent film actresses
19th-century Czech women opera singers
20th-century Czech women opera singers
20th-century Czech actresses
Musicians from Prague